For the Love of Mike is a novel by Rhys Bowen and published by St. Martin's Press (now owned by Macmillan Publishers) on 30 November 2003, which later went on to win the Anthony Award for Best Historical Mystery in 2004.

References 

Anthony Award-winning works
British mystery novels
British historical novels
2003 British novels
St. Martin's Press books